Lew Palter (born November 3, 1928) is an American film, stage and television actor. He is perhaps best known for playing Isidor Straus in the 1997 film Titanic and Justice Benjamin Halperin in the 1981 film First Monday in October.

Palter was born in New York. He earned a Doctor of Philosophy degree in theater at Northwestern University. He appeared in New York productions such as The Madwoman of Chaillot and An Enemy of the People. He also directed Off-Broadway plays including Let Man Live, Overruled and The Trial of Lucullus. In 1965, Palter directed and produced with Robert L. Hobbs at the Millbrook Playhouse.

Palter acted and directed on summer stock theaters. He began to appear on screen in 1967 with an appearance in the television series Run for Your Life. Palter guest-starred in television programs including The A-Team, Day by Day, Charlie's Angels, Baretta, The Virginian, Columbo, The High Chaparral, Gunsmoke, Mission: Impossible, The Six Million Dollar Man, Kojak, The Brady Bunch and The Flying Nun. He also played Det. Clark in seven episodes of the American drama television series Delvecchio, and guest-starred on The Doris Day Show. Palter appeared in the films The Steagle, First Monday in October and Titanic.

References

External links 

Rotten Tomatoes profile

1928 births
Living people
People from New York (state)
Male actors from New York (state)
American male film actors
American male television actors
American male stage actors
20th-century American male actors
American theatre directors
Theatre managers and producers
Northwestern University alumni